The 2021 Men's African Nations Volleyball Championship was the 23rd edition of the Men's African Volleyball Championship, a biennial international volleyball tournament organised by the African Volleyball Confederation (CAVB) with Rwanda Volleyball Federation (FRVB). The tournament was held in Kigali, Rwanda from 7 to 14 September 2021. The top two teams of the tournament qualified for the 2022 FIVB Volleyball Men's World Championship as the CAVB representatives.

Qualification
16 teams have registered to participate in the 2021 African Championship.
  originally qualified, but declined to enter.

Pools composition
Ranking from the previous edition was shown in brackets except the host and the teams who did not participate, which were denoted by (–).
The host country and the top 8 ranked teams were seed in the Serpentine system. The 10 remaining teams were drawn in Kigali, Rwanda on 6 September 2021.

Squads

Venue

Pool standing procedure
 Number of matches won
 Match points
 Sets ratio
 Points ratio
 Result of the last match between the tied teams

Match won 3–0 or 3–1: 3 match points for the winner, 0 match points for the loser
Match won 3–2: 2 match points for the winner, 1 match point for the loser.

Group stage
All times are Central Africa Time (UTC+02:00).

Pool A

|}

The match was rescheduled for 10 September at 16:00 after COVID-19 tests for Burundi team were negative.

|}

Pool B

|}

|}

Pool C

|}

|}

Pool D

|}

 The confederation has decided to remove  from the ongoing tournament for having failed to comply with their financial obligations. Their games were forfeited and will receive zero classification point.

|}

Final round
All times are Central Africa Time (UTC+02:00).

9th–16th places

9th–16th quarterfinals
|}

13th–16th semifinals
|}

9th–12th semifinals
|}

15th place match
|}

13th place match
|}

11th place match
|}

9th place match
|}

Final eight

Quarterfinals
|}

5th–8th semifinals
|}

Semifinals
|}

7th place match
|}

5th place match
|}

3rd place match
|}

Final
|}

Final standing

Awards

Most Valuable Player
 Mohamed Al Hachdadi
Best Attacker
 Wassim Ben Tara
Best Blocker
 Christian Voukeng Mbativou
Best Server
 Yvan Arthur Kody

Best Setter
 Khaled Ben Slimene
Best Receiver
 Zouheir El Graoui
Best Libero
 Mohamed Reda

See also
2021 Women's African Nations Volleyball Championship

References

External links
Official website

2019 Men
African Men's Volleyball Championship
Men's African Volleyball Championship
2021 in Rwandan sport
Sports competitions in Rwanda
African Volleyball Championship